Teresa Amuli Nhalingue (died 20 November 2008) was a Mozambican politician. In 1977 she was one of the first group of women elected to the People's Assembly.

Biography
Originally from Niassa Province, Amuli joined the FRELIMO movement in 1965 at the age of 18. She was a FRELIMO candidate in the 1977 parliamentary elections, in which she was one of the first group of 27 women elected to the People's Assembly.  She was re-elected to the Assembly in 1986 from Niassa Province.

She died of a brain tumor at Maputo Central Hospital in November 2008. A secondary school in Espungabera was named for her.

References

20th-century Mozambican women politicians
20th-century Mozambican politicians
Date of birth unknown
FRELIMO politicians
Members of the Assembly of the Republic (Mozambique)
2008 deaths